The Naguilian Road, officially the Quirino Highway and also known as the Baguio–Bauang Road, is a Philippine major highway in northern Luzon that runs from the city of Baguio in the province of Benguet to the municipality of Bauang in the province of La Union.

The  highway traverses the Benguet municipalities of Tuba and Sablan, and the La Union towns of Burgos, Naguilian, and Bauang.

The highway serves as a major access route to Baguio. It is primarily used by motorists coming from the port city of San Fernando as well as the northern provinces of the Ilocos Region to get to the city.

Although Quirino Highway is the official name of the road, most people are more used to calling it by its former name. It is also a component of National Route 54 (N54) of the Philippine highway network, where Kennon Road also belongs.

History
Naguilian Road, as it was once known, was the first and only road connecting the city to the lowlands, until Kennon Road was built in 1901. The highway was renamed into "President Elpidio Quirino Highway", in honor of former Philippine President Elpidio Quirino.

Intersections

See also

References

Roads in Benguet
Roads in La Union